The 2020–21 European Rugby Challenge Cup preliminary stage is the first stage of the competition in what is the seventh season of the European Rugby Challenge Cup.  The competition involves fourteen teams competing in a single league – with teams playing three opponents from another domestic competition home and away.  The preliminary stage began on 11 December 2020 and was due to be completed on 23 January 2021.

The top eight ranked teams in the league will advance to the last 16 with the teams ranked fifth to eight in both pools of the Champions Cup.

Teams are awarded group points based on match performances. Four points are awarded for a win, two points for a draw, one attacking bonus point for scoring four or more tries in a match and one defensive bonus point for losing a match by seven points or fewer.

The  preliminary stage was suspended after two rounds on 11 January 2021.

Tiebreakers 
In the event of a tie between two or more teams, the following tie-breakers are used, as directed by EPCR:

 Where teams have played each other
 The club with the greater number of competition points from only matches involving tied teams.
 If equal, the club with the best aggregate points difference from those matches.
 If equal, the club that scored the most tries in those matches.
 Where teams remain tied and/or have not played each other in the competition (i.e. are from different pools)
 The club with the best aggregate points difference from the pool stage.
 If equal, the club that scored the most tries in the pool stage.
 If equal, the club with the fewest players suspended in the pool stage.
 If equal, the drawing of lots will determine a club's ranking.

Table

Matches

Round 1

Round 2 

Following round 2 the competition was temporarily suspended. It was later confirmed that the postponed matches would not take place.

References

Notes

EPCR Challenge Cup pool stages
2020–21 European Rugby Challenge Cup